Esfidan (also Romanized as Esfīdān; also known as Esfedān, Espīdān, and Sepīdān) is a village in Karkas Rural District, in the Central District of Natanz County, Isfahan Province, Iran. At the 2006 census, its population was 137, in 39 families.

References 

Populated places in Natanz County